Folligny station (French: Gare de Folligny) is a railway station serving the town Folligny, Manche department, northwestern France. It is situated on the Lison–Lamballe railway.

Services

The station is served by regional trains to Granville, Argentan, Caen, Paris and Rennes.

References

Railway stations in Manche
Railway stations in France opened in 1870